Recordoxylon is a genus of flowering plants in the legume family, Fabaceae. It belongs to the subfamily Caesalpinioideae. Currently, there is no commercial usage for it, not as decoration nor for its nutritive properties.

The genus name of Recordoxylon is in honour of Samuel J. Record (1881–1945), an American botanist who played a prominent role in the study of trees and wood. 
It was first described and published in Trop. Woods Vol.39 on page 16 in 1934.

Its native range is northern South America and is found in northern Brazil, Colombia, French Guiana, Guyana and Venezuela.

Species

References

Cassieae
Plants described in 1934
Flora of Guyana
Flora of North Brazil
Flora of Colombia
Flora of French Guiana
Flora of Venezuela
Fabaceae genera
Taxa named by Adolpho Ducke